Red FM was a commercial radio network covering regional Western Australia. Formerly only broadcasting to mine sites, Red FM later covered every town north of Perth and following the re-branding of WAFM, included the major centres of Broome, Port Hedland, Karratha and Geraldton. Red FM was a part of the Redwave Media Group owned by Seven West Media and targeted 18 to 39 year-old listeners with a contemporary hit radio format. Red FM operated under the Australian radio callsigns 6RED, 6HED, 6FMS and 6GGG.

History
Red FM was launched in 1998, initially as a mining radio station providing news and music to the remote mining areas. It later extended its broadcast reach to other remote areas and towns that were previously served by WAFM. Red FM had the largest geographical service area for a commercial radio network in the Southern Hemisphere. Its target audience was the 4–50 group with a potential listening audience of 185,000 people statewide. Red FM generally broadcast to the same area as its sister, the Spirit Radio Network.

In October 2019, Red FM was included in the sale of Redwave Media to Southern Cross Austereo. On 16 March 2020, Red FM programming was replaced with that of Hit Western Australia, with local advertising feeds retained for Broome, Geraldton, Karratha, Port Hedland and remote Western Australia.

Frequencies

References

External links

Australian radio networks
Contemporary hit radio stations in Australia
Radio stations established in 1988
Radio stations disestablished in 2020
Radio stations in Western Australia
Seven Network
1988 establishments in Australia
2020 disestablishments in Australia